Jacksonville is a city located in Cherokee County, Texas, United States. The population was 13,997 at the 2020 U.S. census. It is the principal city of the Jacksonville micropolitan statistical area, which includes all of Cherokee County.

Jacksonville is located in East Texas, north of the county seat, Rusk, and south of Tyler, in Smith County.

Area production and shipping of tomatoes gained the town the title "Tomato Capital of the World". The impressive red iron ore rock Tomato Bowl, built by Works Progress Administration workers during the Great Depression, is home to the Jacksonville High School "Fightin' Indians" football and soccer teams. Annual events include the "Tops in Texas Rodeo" held in May and the "Tomato Fest" celebration in June.

History
Jacksonville began in 1847 as the town of Gum Creek. Jackson Smith built a home and blacksmith shop in the area, and became postmaster in 1848, when a post office was authorized. Shortly afterward, Dr. William Jackson established an office near Smith's shop. When the townsite was laid out in 1850, the name Jacksonville was chosen in honor of these two men. The name of the post office was changed from Gum Creek to Jacksonville in June 1850.

Despite never having organized unions in any Walmart stores before, meatcutters working at the Jacksonville Walmart voted in favor of organizing under the wing of the United Food and Commercial Workers union in February 2000. During a flurry of subsequent legal actions, Walmart discontinued store-level meatcutting and started shipping in pre-packaged/pre-frozen meat to their stores.  When all the hearings and appeals were exhausted, it was decided that the local meatcutters didn't embody the characteristics of a group that could bargain since they weren't specialized. Even now, there is no one in the Jacksonville meat department to make special cuts of meat or any union presence there.

Geography 

Lake Jacksonville
Lake Jacksonville is three miles (5 km) southwest of Jacksonville.  It is the city's primary water source.  It is a popular location for recreation and residences.  It was created in 1957 and the city expected it to take years to fill with water from the surrounding creeks.  But, with an unusually rainy season, the lake reached full capacity in a year.
 Lake characteristics
Location: 3 miles southwest of Jacksonville off US 79
Surface area: 1,320 acres
Maximum depth: 62 feet
Impounded: 1957

Climate
With records only dating to 1953, Jacksonville was one a few Texas locations to have its all time low occur during the 2021 Texas power crisis cold snap in February 2021.

Demographics

As of the 2020 United States census, there were 13,997 people, 5,027 households, and 3,670 families residing in the city.

Government

Local government
According to the city's most recent Adopted Budget, the city's various funds had $14.9 million in Revenues, $15.7 million in expenditures, and $4.4 million fund balance.

Management of the city and coordination of city services are provided by:

State government
Jacksonville is represented in the Texas Senate by Republican Robert Nichols, District 3, and in the Texas House of Representatives by Republican Travis Clardy, District 11.

Federal government
At the Federal level, the two U.S. Senators from Texas are Republicans John Cornyn and Ted Cruz; Jacksonville is part of the Fifth Congressional District, represented by Republican Lance Gooden.

Recreation
The Jacksonville Public Library served the City of Jacksonville and Cherokee County for over 70 years. The Library was a member of the Texas Library Association, the Northeast Texas Library System and the Forest Trails Library Consortium. In September 2020, the lot it sat on was sold to Chick-fil-A, where construction promptly began on a restaurant location. The new Jacksonville Public Library is planned to open in April 2021, in the Norman Activities Center. Until the opening of the new location, Jacksonville residents have been allowed to visit the Rusk Public Library with library card fines waived.

Education
The city of Jacksonville is served by the Jacksonville Independent School District.  Jacksonville High School, the district's only high school, has "Fightin' Indians"/"Maidens" as mascots for its team sports.

Colleges, universities

Jacksonville College and the Baptist Missionary Association Theological Seminary, both of which are owned by the Baptist Missionary Association of America, are located in Jacksonville.

Lon Morris College, a United Methodist Church operated private junior college, was located in Jacksonville until ceasing operations in 2012.

Transportation
Many highways pass through and intersect in Jacksonville: US 69, US 79, US 175, SH 135, SH 204, FM 347, FM 768, FM 2138, and Loop 456. However, no Interstate highways pass through the city limits

Where 3 railroads once served the Jacksonville area (Southern Pacific and Cotton Belt abandoned their tracks in the mid-1980s), only one, Union Pacific, remains.

Cherokee County Airport is the sole airport within Jacksonville, but solely serves general aviation. Commercial aviation can be accessed by traveling north to Tyler Pounds Regional Airport with an American Eagle flight to Dallas/Fort Worth International Airport (DFW), or simply driving 132 miles directly to either DFW or Dallas Love Field via U.S. Route 175.

Notable people

 Kevin Aldridge, former Tennessee Titans Defensive Lineman
 Ray Benge, baseball pitcher
 Bruce Channel, singer/songwriter
 Travis Clardy, Texas House of Representatives member for District 11
 John Clark, previous state-championship-winning high school football coach and later athletic director for Plano ISD in Plano
 Al Dexter, country music singer
 Sandy Duncan, actress, originally from Henderson, graduated from the former Lon Morris College
 Paul Gipson, running back
 Toby Gowin, former NFL punter
 Micah Hoffpauir, former Chicago Cubs first baseman
 Craig James, former pro football player, former ESPN and Fox Sports commentator
 John B. Kendrick, (1857–1933), United States Senator from Wyoming and ninth Governor of Wyoming, was born on a ranch near Jacksonville
 Pete Lammons, former New York Jets tight end and defensive end
 Billy Martindale, former pro golfer, golf course designer
 Margo Martindale, award-winning actress, graduated from the former Lon Morris College
 Josh McCown, New York Jets quarterback
 Luke McCown, former NFL quarterback
 Neal McCoy, country music singer
 Robert Nichols, Texas State Senator (2007–present), former Jacksonville mayor and city councillor; a park and an intermediate school in the city bear his surname
 Grady Nutt, (1934–1982), was a Christian minister and humorist who resided in Jacksonville for several years; many of his stories are based on people and places in the Jacksonville area
 V. O. Stamps, (1892–1940), was co-founder of the Stamps-Baxter Music Company. He moved to Jacksonville in 1919 to sell gospel songbooks, began the V.O. Stamps Publishing Company in Jacksonville in 1924, and ran the Jacksonville office of the Stamps-Baxter Music Company from its beginning in 1927 until the offices moved to Dallas in 1929
 Alan Tudyk, actor, originally from El Paso, graduated from the former Lon Morris College
 Travis Ward, (1922–2015), independent Texas oil man 
 Lee Ann Womack, country music singer

Notes

References

External links

 City of Jacksonville
 Jacksonville Chamber of Commerce
 Jacksonville Economic Development
 

Cities in Texas
Cities in Cherokee County, Texas
Populated places established in 1847
Micropolitan areas of Texas
1847 establishments in Texas
U.S. Route 69
U.S. Route 79
U.S. Route 175